Athuru Mithuru Hari Apuru is a 2018 Sri Lankan Sinhalese children's film directed by Lal Priyadeva and co-produced by N. Udaya Kumar and P. Arooran for Balaji Cine Films. It stars Mahendra Perera in lead role along with Don Guy and popular television comedian Suranga Satharasinghe, who made his maiden cinema appearance. Music composed by Edward Jayakody. It is the 1318th Sri Lankan film in the Sinhalese cinema.

Cast
 Mahendra Perera
 Suranga Satharasinghe		
 Rajiv Nanayakkara		
 D.B. Gangodathenna		
 Sunil Premakumara		
 Don Guy		
 Samantha Higurage		
 Gamini Subasinghe		
 Inoka Edirisinghe		
 Manel Wanaguru
 Ariyasena Gamage		
 Sugath Janaka		
 Ronnie Leitch

References

External links
 
 Athuru Mithuru Hari Apuru on Facebook

2018 films
2010s Sinhala-language films